Vampire State Building may refer to:

 a fictional building in the Futurama episode Meanwhile
 a French language graphic novel illustrated by Charlie Adlard